Say Your Prayers is a 2020 British black comedy film, which had a working title of  Ilkley. The film stars Roger Allam, Derek Jacobi, Anna Maxwell Martin, Harry Melling, Vinette Robinson and Flora Spencer-Longhurst. Harry Michell directed the film and co-wrote the screenplay with Jamie Fraser, and the producer is Helen Simmons.

Principal photography started in February 2018 in Yorkshire, England. Filming has been completed. The film was released in September 2020.

Cast
Roger Allam
Tom Brooke
Derek Jacobi
Anna Maxwell Martin
Harry Melling
Vinette Robinson
Flora Spencer-Longhurst

References

2020 films
2020 black comedy films
British black comedy films
Films shot in Yorkshire
2020s British films